Ksalon is a moshav in central Israel. Located near Beit Shemesh, it falls under the jurisdiction of Mateh Yehuda Regional Council.

History
The first transit camp (ma'abara) for new Jewish immigrants was set up in 1950 on the lands of the depopulated Palestinian village of Kasla. New immigrants from Yemen brought to Israel in Operation Magic Carpet were given farmland there, but abandoned the moshav a few years later to join members of the Yemenite community living in Rosh Ha'ayin. Their place was taken by Jewish immigrants from Morocco.

References

Moshavim
Agricultural Union
Populated places established in 1952
Populated places in Jerusalem District
Yemeni-Jewish culture in Israel
1952 establishments in Israel